Events from the year 1647 in China.

Incumbents 
 Qing dynasty - Shunzhi Emperor
 Co-regent: Dorgon 
 Co-regent: Jirgalang
 Southern Ming pretender - Yongli Emperor (Zhu Youlang)
 Xi dynasty - Zhang Xianzhong

Events 
 Transition from Ming to Qing
 20 January 1647,  a small Qing force led by former Southern Ming commander Li Chengdong (李成東) captures Guangzhou, kills the Shaowu Emperor and sends the Yongli Emperor fleeing to Nanning in Guangxi.

Deaths 
 Zhang Xianzhong - killed in Shaanxi by Qing forces
 Gao Guiying - female anti-Qing military leader

References

 .